is the pseudonym of , a popular Japanese manga artist. He worked as an assistant for manga artist Fujihiko Hosono before starting his career as an original author. His first work appeared in November 1983 in Young Magazine, and his first series Tokonatsu Bank started in that publication in January 1984 and ran until February 1985.

Takada is better known for his supernatural manga 3x3 Eyes and Blue Seed, and for the comedy-action manga All Purpose Cultural Cat Girl Nuku Nuku. The anime versions of these series star voice-actress Megumi Hayashibara. In 1993, he won the Kodansha Manga Award for shōnen for 3x3 Eyes.

Takada has also worked on character design and illustration for video games, including Enix's Just Breed.

Selected bibliography 
 Shuushoku Beginner (1983)
 Endless Summer Bank aka Tokonatsu Bank (January 2, 1984 – February 18, 1985)
 Tour Conductor, Nikumori (March 3, 1985 – September 1, 1986)
 Sportion KIDs (November 17, 1986 – November 2, 1987)
 Every Day is Sunday (November 13, 1987 – February 10, 1989)
 3x3 Eyes (December 14, 1987 – 2002)
 Toritsuki-kun (February 1989–March 1991)
 All Purpose Cultural Cat Girl Nuku Nuku (1990)
 Blue Seed (1992–1995)
 The New All-Purpose Cultural Cat Girl Nuku Nuku (1997–1998)
 Genzou Hitogata Kiwa (1998–2004)
 Tsukumo Nemuru Shizume (2004–2006)
 Little Jumper (2004–August 2008)
 Ultraman - The First  (2004–2008)
 3x3 Eyes Gaiden (2009-2010)
 Captain Alice (2009-2013)
 Lunfor (2013)
 3x3 Eyes: Genjuu no Mori no Sounansha (2014-2016)
 3x3 Eyes: Kiseki no Yami no Keiyakusha (2016-ongoing)
 Mugou no Schnell Gear: Chikyuugai Kisouka AI (2019-ongoing)

References

External links
 
Schally's Yuzo Takada Page

Manga artists from Tokyo
Winner of Kodansha Manga Award (Shōnen)
Living people
People from Edogawa, Tokyo
Year of birth missing (living people)